Erasmus Lee Gardenhire (1815 – 1899) was a Tennessee politician and judge who served in the Confederate States Congress during the American Civil War.

Biography
Gardenhire was from the Sparta, Tennessee, area. He served in the 28th General Assembly (1849–51) representing White, Fentress, Jackson, Overton, and Van Buren counties. Afterwards, he served as a judge. Following the state's ordinance of secession and the outbreak of the Civil War, he represented Tennessee in the First Confederate Congress from 1862 to 1864.

Following the end of the war, he returned to his legal practice. He was a member of the Tennessee House of Representatives during the 39th General Assembly, 1875–77.

Notes

References
 Robert M. McBride and Dan M. Robinson, eds., Biographical Directory of the Tennessee General Assembly, Volume I, 1796–1861. (Nashville: Tennessee State Library and Archives and Tennessee Historical Commission, 1975).

Members of the Confederate House of Representatives from Tennessee
19th-century American politicians
Democratic Party members of the Tennessee House of Representatives
Tennessee lawyers
People from Sparta, Tennessee
1815 births
1899 deaths
19th-century American lawyers